William Edward Reginald Morrow  (5 March 186911 February 1950)  was an eminent Anglican priest in the 20th century. He was educated at Trinity College, Dublin and  ordained in 1894 for the Curacy of West Ham Parish Church, where he remained   as Senior Curate until 1904. After this he held incumbencies at North Woolwich, All Saints Forest Gate, Clifton, Bristol and Wandsworth before his appointment as the inaugural Provost of Chelmsford.

In 1918 he married Lucy Matilda Watney, the eldest daughter of the brewer, Norman Watney of Westerham, Kent, and they had no children.  Lucy died on 2 January 1923.

Notes

1869 births
Alumni of Trinity College Dublin
Provosts and Deans of Chelmsford
1950 deaths